The  was a pre-modern Japanese literary genre. Texts were written in a humorous, satirical sermon-style with the purpose of educating the masses. It is type of gesaku.

Developments
In 1715, Masuho wrote , and in 1727 Issai wrote . These two texts are early forerunners of the genre. However, the genre is not fully realized until several decades later. In 1752,  wrote , which is identified as the first true example of the dangibon genre.

The genre existed between the 1752 c. 1800, reaching "the height of their popularity in the 1750s." It gradually evolved into the kokkeibon genre at the start of the 19th century.

Major works
 (1715)
 (1727)
 (1752)
 (1752)
 (1754)
 (1763)
 (1763)
 (1774)

See also

Hiraga Gennai, one of the major dangibon authors.

Notes

External links
Manuscript scans of Endō Tukugan: 3 volumes and 6 volumes, Waseda University Library
Manuscript scans of Inaka Sōji: 10 volumes, Waseda University Library
Manuscript scans of Nenashigusa: 4 volumes, 5 volumes, and 1 volume; Waseda University Library
Manuscript scans of Fūryū Shidōken-den: 2 volumes and 5 volumes, Waseda University Library
Manuscript scans of Wasō Byōe: 1 volume, 4 volumes, Waseda University Library

References

 
 
 
 

Japanese literature
Edo-period works
Gesaku
Satire
Japanese satire